Mount Wynne is a  mountain summit located one mile west of the crest of the Sierra Nevada mountain range, in Fresno County of northern California, United States. Mt. Wynne ranks as the 116th highest summit in California. The approach to this remote peak is made via the John Muir Trail. The first ascent of the summit was made in 1935 by a Sierra Club party.

Etymology

The peak's name honors Sedman Walter Wynne (1883–1922), US Forest Service supervisor of the Sequoia National Forest, who died through his official work. He was born in Butte, Montana, attended University of California, and Yale. He died of sudden heart failure at age 39 while on a field trip for the Forest Service attending a football game between University of California and University of Southern California. The mountain's toponym was officially adopted in 1932 by the United States Board on Geographic Names.

Climate
According to the Köppen climate classification system, Mount Wynne is located in an alpine climate zone. Most weather fronts originate in the Pacific Ocean, and travel east toward the Sierra Nevada mountains. As fronts approach, they are forced upward by the peaks, causing them to drop their moisture in the form of rain or snowfall onto the range (orographic lift). Precipitation runoff from the mountain drains into tributaries of the South Fork Kings River.

Gallery

See also

 List of mountain peaks of California

References

External links

 Weather forecast: Mount Wynne

Mountains of Fresno County, California
Mountains of Kings Canyon National Park
North American 4000 m summits
Mountains of Northern California
Sierra Nevada (United States)